The 2009–10 Biathlon World Cup – World Cup 9 was the ninth event of the season and was held in Khanty-Mansiysk, Russia from Thursday 25 until Sunday 28 March 2010.

Schedule of events
The schedule of the event is below

Medal winners

Men

Women

Mixed Relay

Achievements
 Best performance for all time

 , 17 place in Sprint
 , 54 place in Sprint
 , 66 place in Sprint
 , 69 place in Sprint
 , 1 place in Sprint
 , 2 place in Sprint
 , 17 place in Sprint
 , 37 place in Sprint
 , 66 place in Sprint
 , 67 place in Sprint

 First World Cup race

 , 75 place in Sprint
 , 79 place in Sprint

References

- World Cup 9, 2009-10 Biathlon World Cup
Sport in Khanty-Mansiysk
March 2010 sports events in Europe
Biathlon competitions in Russia
2010 in Russian sport